The Creature of Black Water Lake is the thirteenth novel in World of Adventure series by Gary Paulsen. It was published on June 9, 1997 by Random House.

Plot
The story is about Ryan Swanner and his mom who have just moved to the mountain resort of Black Water Lake. The locals tell of a giant, ancient creature which lives beneath the lake's seemingly calm surface.

Novels by Gary Paulsen
1997 American novels
American young adult novels
American adventure novels
Random House books